Mirsad Mijadinoski (born 1 October 1981) is a Macedonian former professional footballer who played as a defender.

Club career
He began his career in Switzerland with FC Zürich, FC Schaffhausen and FC Baden. He played for FC Sion in the Swiss Super League and later ha was on loan at Hungarian side Újpest FC. He signed a four-year contract with Debreceni VSC on 31 August 2009.

References

External links

Profile at Macedonian Football

1981 births
Living people
Sportspeople from Struga
Association football central defenders
Macedonian footballers
FC Zürich players
FC Schaffhausen players
FC Baden players
FC Sion players
Újpest FC players
Debreceni VSC players
FC Wil players
Swiss Super League players
Swiss Challenge League players
Nemzeti Bajnokság I players
Macedonian expatriate footballers
Expatriate footballers in Switzerland
Expatriate footballers in Hungary
Macedonian expatriate sportspeople in Switzerland
Macedonian expatriate sportspeople in Hungary